The 1911 Eastern North America heat wave was an 11-day severe heat wave that killed at least 380 people though estimates have put the death toll as high as 2,000 people. The heat wave began on July 4, 1911 and didn't cease until July 15. In Nashua, New Hampshire, the temperature peaked at 106 °F (41 °C). In New York City alone, 158 people and 600 horses died.

Description 

Throughout June, the temperature had been consistent with what normally was felt during New England summers, but starting in July, dry air which originated from the southern great plains began to flow into Canada before being swept south toward the east coast. The hot wind suppressed cooler ocean breezes, and this caused the temperature to rise so suddenly and dramatically that in Providence there was an 11 degree rise in temperature in a half hour.

The area between Pennsylvania and Maine was reportedly most affected by the heat. During the 11 days, temperature records were set all over New England. In Boston, the temperature rose to 104° (40 °C) on July 4, an all-time record high that still stands today.

Toronto saw temperatures as high as 103° (39.4 °C) to 105° (40.6 °C), the highest temperature until 1936.

The heatwave was finally ended by a severe thunderstorm, which traveled across the Northeast and killed an additional five people.

Heatwave impacts 

The first day of the heatwave caused crowds in major cities to form around thermometers so they could watch the temperature rise. Pedestrians in these crowds reportedly began to collapse from heat stroke as the day went by. By night time, mothers walked the street with crying infants hoping to keep them awake in fear that if they slept in their cribs they would not awaken.

As the heat wave's second day began, 17 people had died from drowning alone after trying to swim in order to escape the heat. By the time the sun had risen on July 5, industry had come to a standstill. Throughout the region factories were closed and mail service was suspended. Due to the temperature indoors many began sleeping outside either on roofs of apartments or on sidewalks with at least 5,000 people sleeping on the Boston Common alone.

Besides deaths caused directly by the heat, it was reported that in every major city affected by the heatwave that the temperatures had been driving people insane and causing suicides. One such example reported by The New London Day, was of an elderly Boston man named Jacob Seegar who reportedly was driven so insane by the heat that he killed himself with a revolver in order to escape it.

Due to the excessive heat rail lines had become melted and bent.

The death toll continued to rise until finally a sudden thunderstorm brought a wave of relief, soon after which temperatures returned to their normal levels for good.

The 1911 heat wave is considered the most deadly weather related disaster in the history of New England. In Philadelphia alone, 158 people were reported to have died from the heatwave and across the north east 200 people were reported to have drowned while swimming in an attempt to escape the heat.

See also 

 Ice famine
 1896 Eastern North America heat wave

References

External links 

 

Heat waves in the United States
Eastern North America heat wave
Eastern North America
Eastern North America heat wave
Eastern North America heat wave
Eastern North America heat wave